The Government of the 5th Dáil or the 3rd Executive Council (23 June 1927 – 11 October 1927) was formed after the June 1927 general election held on 9 June 1927. It was led by W. T. Cosgrave, leader of Cumann na nGaedheal, as President of the Executive Council, who had led the government since August 1922.

The 3rd Executive Council lasted  days.

3rd Executive Council of the Irish Free State

Nomination of President of the Executive Council
The 5th Dáil first met on 23 June 1927. In the debate on the nomination of the President of the Executive Council, Cumann na nGaedheal leader and outgoing President W. T. Cosgrave was proposed, and this resolution was carried with 68 votes in favour and 22 against. Cosgrave was then appointed as President of the Executive Council by Governor-General Tim Healy.

Members of the Executive Council
The members of the Executive Council were nominated by the President and approved by the Dáil by a vote of 66 to 31. They were then appointed by the Governor General.

Parliamentary Secretaries
The Executive Council appointed Parliamentary Secretaries on the nomination of the President. The first three were appointed on 24 June 1927.

Actions of the government
After the assassination of Kevin O'Higgins on 10 July 1927, the Executive Council proposed the Electoral (Amendment) (No. 2) Bill. This legislation provided for the disqualification for five years of any member of the Oireachtas who did not take the Oath of Allegiance prescribed in Article 17 of the Constitution of the Irish Free State. After this legislation had passed both houses, the TDs elected for Fianna Fáil led by Éamon de Valera took the oath and entered the Dáil for the first time since the 1922 general election.

Confidence in the government
On 16 August, Labour Party leader Thomas Johnson proposed a motion of no confidence in the Executive Council. The motion was defeated, but only on the casting vote of the Ceann Comhairle Michael Hayes, giving a final vote of 71 votes to 72. On 24 August, Cumann na nGaedheal won two by-elections, and sought to capitalise on this success by calling a new general election seeking an increased mandated. The president sought a dissolution of the Dáil and a new election was held in September 1927.

See also
Dáil Éireann
Government of Ireland
Constitution of the Irish Free State
Politics of the Republic of Ireland

References

Ministries of George V
Government 05
Governments of the Irish Free State
1927 establishments in Ireland
1927 disestablishments in Ireland
Cabinets established in 1927
Cabinets disestablished in 1927
Minority governments
5th Dáil